"Stay Strong" is a song performed by British pop duo Bars and Melody. The song was released in the United Kingdom as a digital download on 5 April 2015 as the third single from their debut studio album 143 (2015). The song peaked at number 53 on the UK Singles Chart.

Music video
A music video to accompany the release of "Stay Strong" was first released onto YouTube on 4 April 2015 at a total length of three minutes and twenty seconds. The video was directed by Ryan Mackfall and produced by Crashburn Media.

Track listing

Charts

Release history

References

2015 songs
2015 singles